HMS Daedalus was a 32-gun fifth rate frigate of the Royal Navy, launched in 1780 from the yards of John Fisher, of Liverpool. She went on to serve in the American War of Independence, as well as the French Revolutionary and Napoleonic Wars.

American War of Independence
Daedalus entered service in 1780 under the command of Captain Thomas Pringle. He escorted a convoy to North America in May 1781, accompanied by Captain Horatio Nelson in the 28-gun Sixth rate . Pringle went on to serve in the English Channel the following year, capturing the French privateer Moustic on 20 January 1782, and the privateer Légère on 11 December 1782. Pringle escorted a convoy to Newfoundland during the year, and in 1783 was engaged in patrolling the Shetland fisheries. The Daedalus was paid off in July 1784, and in 1790 underwent a Great Repair at Rotherhithe, that lasted until 1793.

French Revolutionary and Napoleonic Wars

Captain Charles Henry Knowles recommissioned the Daedalus in March 1793, and sailed her to the Halifax station. Knowles was replaced by Captain Thomas Williams in September 1794, during which time Daedalus was part of Admiral Adam Duncan's fleet. In September 1795, Captain George Countess took over, and Daedalus sailed to the West African coast and then on to Jamaica. In January 1797, Daedalus was deployed against the French Expédition d'Irlande and on 8 January she was involved in the capture of the troopship Suffren and burnt her to avoid weakening the crew by dispersing them in the prize.

Command passed to Henry Lidgbird Ball in March 1797.

In late 1797 or early 1798 Daedalus and  captured six vessels off Gorée:
American snow Rebecca, which had sailed from Charlestown. Her cargo included pitch, tar, dry goods, tobacco, molasses and gunpowder. The British took the naval and gunpowder, which they landed, and then released the vessel.
American ship President, carrying a cargo of salt belonging to English merchants. The French had taken the ship off the Islands de Loss and the British had recaptured her off the mouth of the River Gambia. The British returned the vessel and her cargo to the owner after receiving salvage money.
Ship , late of Liverpool, which was of 260 tons, 10 guns and a crew of 36. She was trading on the coast and had a cargo of merchandise and 337 slaves.
Sloop , which the British recaptured and which had belonged to the Sierra Leone Company. She was carrying cloth, iron, beads and ten slaves.
French schooner Prosperité, carrying Guinea Corn. She was disposed of at Gorée.
The British destroyed the armed ship Bell, of 20 guns.

Daedalus and Hornet, and the letter of marque slave ships  and  shared, by agreement in the proceeds of the recapture of Quaker (December 1797) and Ocean (January 1798).

In the action of 9 February 1799, Daedalus captured the 36-gun Prudente off the Cape of Good Hope. He sailed on to the East Indies, operating successfully in the Dutch East Indies at Batavia Roads. Command then passed temporarily to Lieutenant Charles James Johnson and then Captain William Waller before Daedalus returned to Britain and was placed in reserve in 1803. She was fitted out for service with Trinity House that year, followed by repair works from December 1805 to December 1806 to fit her out as a floating battery on the Thames at Woolwich. She recommissioned under Captain Frederick Warren in December 1806 and in March 1807 sailed for Jamaica. She was in action on 11 November 1808 when she helped in the capture of the town of Samana in San Domingo, also taking the 5-gun privateers Guerrière and Exchange.

Fate
Command passed to Captain Samuel Inglefield, who transferred from HMS Bacchante in 1808. In November Daedalus was one of the vessels in the squadron under Sir Charles Dashwood. Daedalus continued on the Jamaica station until a hurricane badly damaged her. A survey found her to be rotten throughout; she was paid off in October 1810 and broken up at Sheerness in July 1811.

Citations and references
Citations

References

External links
 

Ships built on the River Mersey
Frigates of the Royal Navy
1780 ships
Floating batteries of the Royal Navy